Amphonyx is a genus of hawkmoths in the family Sphingidae erected by Felipe Poey in 1832.

Species
Amphonyx duponchel Poey, 1832
Amphonyx haxairei (Cadiou, 2006)
Amphonyx jamaicensis Eitschberger, 2006
Amphonyx kofleri Eitschberger, 2006
Amphonyx lucifer (Rothschild & Jordan, 1903)
Amphonyx mephisto (Haxaire & Vaglia, 2002)
Amphonyx rivularis Butler, 1875
Amphonyx vitrinus (Rothschild & Jordan 1910)

References 

 
Sphingini
Moth genera
Taxa named by Felipe Poey